Stephen Harold Halliwell (born 21 March 1946) is an English actor, known for portraying the role of Zak Dingle in the ITV soap opera Emmerdale, which he has played since 1994 and as of 2023 is currently the third longest serving cast member.

Life and career
Halliwell was born in Bury, Lancashire, on 21 March 1954 to parents Fred and Jenny Halliwell. He has an older brother, Clive, who is two years older than him. Halliwell was an apprentice engineer and had a number of jobs mainly in cotton and paper mills before drama training at the Mountview Theatre School. He was a founding member of the Interchange Theatre in Bury. Halliwell was once arrested for sleeping rough in an empty government building in London. He was sent to a prison in Ashford for two weeks and was later released on probation. He has also spoke openly about his experiences with depression throughout this period of his life.

During the 1970s, 1980s and 1990s, he featured in a number of British television series, including Here I Stand, Threads, Cracker, Crown Court, G.B.H. Heartbeat and Coronation Street. Then in 1994, he joined the cast of the ITV soap opera Emmerdale as Zak Dingle. Together with Emmerdale co-stars Billy Hartman and Alun Lewis, he was a member of UK 1990s country rock trio the Woolpackers who released the single "Hillbilly Rock Hillbilly Roll" in November 1996. In 2003, Halliwell took a short break from Emmerdale for personal reasons. He later said that the break was due to staying at a rehabilitation centre for alcoholism. In September 2018, Halliwell had to take five months off from Emmerdale for health reasons, which he later revealed was due to having a heart surgery and a pacemaker fitted. Halliwell released an autobiography in 2014 called If The Cap Fits: My Rocky Road to Emmerdale.

References

External links
 

1946 births
20th-century English male actors
21st-century English male actors
Alumni of the Mountview Academy of Theatre Arts
English male stage actors
English male television actors
Living people
People from Bury, Greater Manchester
People with mood disorders